Pride of the Wicked is the second full-length album by Christian metal band War of Ages. The album was released on September 5, 2006 on Facedown Records. It was the first album to feature T.J. Alford, formerly of Mortal Treason.

Track listing 
"Guide for the Helpless" - (4:27)
"Rise From the Ashes - (3:59)
"Strength Within - (3:51)
"Absence of Fear - (3:20)
"The Fall of Pride - (4:40)
"Heart of a Warrior - (3:54)
"Aftermath - (4:37)
"Bitter Sweet - (3:38)
"Silenced Insecurities - (3:54)
"Stone By Stone - (4:56)

Personnel

War of Ages 
 Leroy Hamp – lead vocals
 Steve Brown – lead guitar, backing vocals
 Jonathan Lynch – rhythm guitar, backing vocals
 T.J. Alford – bass guitar, backing vocals
 Alex Hamp – drums

Production 
 Dave Quiggle - artwork

2006 albums
War of Ages albums
Facedown Records albums